This is a record of Austria's results at the FIFA World Cup. Austria has played at seven World Cup finals tournaments, most recently in 1998. They also qualified for the tournament in 1938, but withdrew after the annexation of Austria by the Third Reich, with some of its team members joining the German team.

Summary

1930 World Cup in Uruguay

The first edition of the FIFA World Cup in Uruguay was the only one without qualifiers. However, the Austrian Football Association chose not to participate.

1934 World Cup in Italy

After defeating France and Hungary on their way into the semi-finals, the strong Austrian squad lost 0–1 to hosts and eventual champions Italy. In the Third Place Match against Germany, Austria conceded a goal after 25 seconds by Ernst Lehner - the fastest goal in World Cup history until 1962.

1938 World Cup in France

After qualifying by defeating Latvia in the qualifiers, Austria was drawn against Sweden in the first round. However, after the Anschluss in March 1938, the Austrian Football Association was incorporated into the German system. Nine Austrian players were called up for the German national squad instead. After being fielded in the opening match against Switzerland, Willibald Schmaus and goalkeeper Rudolf Raftl were the first players ever to represent two different nations at the FIFA World Cup. The match ended 1-1. In the decisive rematch, Austrian striker Wilfried Hahnemann scored the opening goal, but the final score was 2-4 and Germany eliminated from the tournament.

1950 World Cup in Brazil

Austria initially registered to participate and was supposed to play Turkey in the qualifications, but withdrew. At a later stage, Turkey also withdrew.

1982 World Cup in Spain 

Drawn in Group 2 alongside Algeria, Chile, and the Federal Republic of (West) Germany, Austria gained traction by defeating the South Americans 1–0 in the first group match. Austria later won 2–0 over the Algerians that saw them at a comfortable position in the group stage; however, Algeria, having already beaten West Germany in an upset, found themselves victorious against an already-eliminated Chile, and thus were all-but guaranteed to proceed to the next round alongside Germany, potentially leaving Austria out.

Austria played their decisive final group stage encounter against neighbors West Germany in Gijón, Spain, in one of the most controversial matches in World Cup history. Nicknamed "the Disgrace of Gijón, the match saw West Germany scoring once against Austria before both teams and players deliberately played underwhelmingly, wasting the clock and mathematically having both European teams of the group qualify at the expense of Africa's Algeria, the latter whom had defeated the Chileans a day prior to conclude their part of the group stage. Outrage from Algerian fans and Spanish spectators ensued, and both the German and Austrian media condemned the underhanded tactics of both teams' method of subversive "boring" football, with the German commentary team constantly apologizing to viewers for the sub-par action. Algerian football fans dubbed the match "the Anschluss", a reference to Austria being annexed by Germany under the Nazi regime. Austria saw themselves bowing out in a three-team group of the second stage, losing to France and drawing with Northern Ireland. Meanwhile, West Germany reached the final, losing 3–1 to European rivals Italy.

Record at the FIFA World Cup

*Draws include knockout matches decided via penalty shoot-out.

By Match

Record by Opponent

Record players

Top goalscorers

Awards

Team awards

Third Place 1954

Individual awards

Silver Ball 1934: Matthias Sindelar
Silver Boot 1954: Erich Probst

Ernst Happel has won 2nd Place as a coach with the Netherlands in 1978 after losing the final 3-1 a.e.t. to Argentina

See also

 
Countries at the FIFA World Cup
FIFA World Cup